First Cambodia Airlines （SC：柬埔寨第一航空）was a privately owned airline based in Cambodia. Because of financial problems, it ceased operations in 2004.

Code data

IATA Code: F6
ICAO Code: FCC
Callsign: FIRST CAMBODIA

History

The airline was established in February 2004, but ceased operations on 2 August 2004 after financial difficulties meant its aircraft had to be returned to the lessor.

Services

First Cambodia Airlines operated services from Phnom Penh to Singapore, Kuala Lumpur and Guangzhou.

Fleet

The First Cambodia Airlines fleet consisted of 1 leased Airbus A320-232 aircraft from ILFC.

External links

First Cambodia Airlines Former Fleet Detail 

Defunct airlines of Cambodia
Airlines established in 2004
Airlines disestablished in 2004
Cambodian companies established in 2004